Frankland Estate is an Australian winery based at Frankland River, in the Frankland River wine region of Western Australia.  It is particularly well known for its Riesling wines.

See also

 Australian wine
 List of wineries in Western Australia
 Western Australian wine

References

Notes

Bibliography

External links
 – official site

Companies established in 1988
Great Southern (Western Australia)
Wineries in Western Australia
1988 establishments in Australia